Stefan Ploc (24 March 1914 – 24 November 2003) was an Austrian footballer. He played in two matches for the Austria national football team in 1945.

References

External links
 

1914 births
2003 deaths
Austrian footballers
Austria international footballers
Place of birth missing
Association footballers not categorized by position